Nueva Era may refer to:

 Nueva Era, Ilocos Norte, a municipality in Philippines
 Nueva era (Yuri album), 1993
 Nueva era (Amistades Peligrosas album), 1997
 Nueva Era Basket Club, a basketball club in Equatorial Guinea